Sir Edward Hussey Packe KBE DL JP (6 January  1878 – 11 May 1946) was a British civil servant.

Early life
He was the son of Hussey Packe and his wife, Lady Alice, only daughter of John Wodehouse, 1st Earl of Kimberley. His grandfather was politician George Hussey Packe.  He was educated at Eton College.

Public duty
He was High Sheriff of Leicestershire in 1911,  and Chairman  of Leicestershire County Council

Civil Service
Assistant Private Secretary to The Most Honourable  Henry Petty-FitzMaurice, 6th Marquess of Lansdowne at War Office (1900)
Assistant Private Secretary to Right Honourable William Palmer, 2nd Earl of Selborne at the Admiralty (1901–1905)
Assistant Private Secretary to Right Honourable  Frederick Archibald Vaughan Campbell, 3rd Earl Cawdor (1905)
Assistant Private Secretary to Right Honourable  Arthur James Balfour, 1st Earl of Balfour (1916)
Assistant Private Secretary to Sir Edward Carson (1916–1917)
Private Secretary to Sir Eric Geddes (1917–1919)
Private Secretary to Walter Long (1919)
Attached to Admiralty Staff (1914–1919)

Honours
He was appointed a Knight Commander of the Order of the British Empire (KBE) in 1920. He was also awarded the Legion of Honour and the Order of Crown of Italy.

Personal life
He married, in 1909, the Honourable Mary Sydney Colebrooke, daughter of Edward Colebrooke, 1st Baron Colebrooke. They had two daughters:

Penelope Mary Packe  who married, as his second wife, John Drury Boteler Packe-Drury-Lowe (1905–1960) in 1936 and assumed as additional surname Packe and had issue  Simon Jasper Packe-Drury-Lowe (born 1938).
Ursula Sybil Packe who married first in 1934  Peter Clifton of  Clifton Hall Clifton, Nottinghamshire and divorced. She married secondly Lord David Crichton-Stuart later Stuart (1911–1970) son of 4th Marquess of Bute and had issue.

Packe lived at Prestwold Hall, Prestwold, near Loughborough, Leicestershire, which had been purchased by his ancestor Lord Mayor of London  Sir Christopher Packe. He died at Prestwold Hall in 1946.

References 

1878 births
1946 deaths
People from Mayfair
People from Loughborough
High Sheriffs of Leicestershire
Deputy Lieutenants of Leicestershire
People educated at Eton College
Knights Commander of the Order of the British Empire
English justices of the peace